The following is a list of seasons completed by the Gardner–Webb Runnin' Bulldogs football team. The Bulldogs compete in the Big South Conference of the NCAA Division I FCS. Since the program's inception in 1970, Gardner–Webb has claimed four conference championships, including two in the Big South. The Bulldogs have had nine head coaches in their history, including current head coach Carroll McCray. The Bulldogs play their home games out of 9,000-seat Ernest W. Spangler Stadium, as they have since 1969.

Seasons

Notes

References

Gardner-Webb
Gardner–Webb Runnin' Bulldogs football seasons